Jeff Lipsky is an American screenwriter and film director.  He has written and directed such films as Flannel Pajamas (2006), Twelve Thirty (2011), Molly's Theory of Relativity (2013), Mad Women (2015) and The Last (2019).  He is also one of the co-founders of the now-defunct film distribution studio October Films.

He grew up in Plainview, New York.  He was married to Maura Hoy.

Filmography

References

External links
 

Living people
21st-century American screenwriters
People from Plainview, New York
American male screenwriters
American film directors
Screenwriters from New York (state)
20th-century American screenwriters
Year of birth missing (living people)